The Kofiau paradise kingfisher (Tanysiptera ellioti) is a tree kingfisher belonging to the family Alcedinidae, subfamily Halcyoninae.

Taxonomy
This little-known bird is sometimes considered a subspecies of the common paradise kingfisher (T. galatea), but it is morphologically distinct and del Hoyo lists it as a separate species.

Distribution

This species is endemic to the Indonesian island Kofiau, off the west coast of New Guinea.

Habitat
The Kofiau paradise kingfisher inhabits primary forest, tall secondary forest and subtropical/tropical moist lowlands. The species is also common in lightly wooded village gardens.

Description
The head and upper parts of both male and female are dark blue and the rump, tail and underparts are white. The central tail feathers are long and tapering. The bill is scarlet.

Biology
It feeds on insects and worms that it catches on the ground.

References

Kofiau paradise kingfisher
Birds of the Raja Ampat Islands
Kofiau paradise kingfisher